Winfried Gottschalk (19 May 1944 – 19 June 2021) was a German racing cyclist. He rode in the 1968 Tour de France.

References

External links
 

1944 births
2021 deaths
German male cyclists
Cyclists from Cologne
Place of birth missing